Franklin Pierce Lake, also known as Jackman Reservoir, is a  reservoir located in Hillsborough County in southern New Hampshire, United States, in the towns of Hillsborough and Antrim. It is named for Franklin Pierce, the 14th president of the United States, who was born in Hillsborough. The lake impounds the North Branch of the Contoocook River and lies within the Merrimack River watershed.

The lake is classified as a warmwater fishery, with observed species including rainbow trout, brown trout, largemouth bass, smallmouth bass, chain pickerel, horned pout, white perch, northern pike, bluegill, and black crappie.

See also

List of lakes in New Hampshire
New Hampshire Historical Marker No. 203: Stone Arch Bridges

References

External links
 Map of the lake and its access points via NH.gov

Lakes of Hillsborough County, New Hampshire
Reservoirs in New Hampshire